Datuk Ahmad Marzuk bin Shaary (Jawi  أحمد مرزوق بن شاعري; born 7 December 1975) is a Malaysian politician who has served as the Member of Parliament (MP) for Pengkalan Chepa since May 2018. He served as the Deputy Minister in the Prime Minister's Department in charge of Religious Affairs for the second term in the Barisan Nasional (BN) administration under former Prime Minister Ismail Sabri Yaakob and former Minister Idris Ahmad from August 2021 to the collapse of the BN administration in November 2022 and the first term in the Perikatan Nasional (PN) administration under former Prime Minister Muhyiddin Yassin and former Minister Zulkifli Mohamad Al-Bakri from March 2020 to the collapse of the PN administration in August 2021 as well as the MP for Bachok from May 2013 to May 2018.

Politics 

At the party level, Ahmad Marzuk is the PAS Central Working Committee.

He contested for Bachok parliamentary seat in 2013, defeating former deputy minister Awang Adek Hussin with a slim majority. In 2018 General Election, he contested for Pengkalan Chepa parliamentary seat.

In the Malaysian Cabinet 2020, he is appointed Deputy Minister in the Prime Minister's Department of Malaysia (Religious Affairs) by Prime Minister, Muhyiddin Yassin to assist Dr. Zulkifli Mohamad Al-Bakri.

Election results

Honours
  :
  Knight Commander of the Order of the Territorial Crown (PMW) – Datuk (2021)
 
 Companion of the Order of the Life of the Crown of Kelantan (JMK) (2019)

References 

1975 births
Living people
Prime Minister's Department (Malaysia)
Malaysian Islamic Party politicians
Universiti Sains Malaysia alumni
People from Kelantan